Anomoses hylecoetes is a species of primitive hepialoid moth endemic to Queensland and New South Wales, Australia . It is the only species in its genus Anomoses, which is the only genus in the family Anomosetidae.

References

External links
Tree of Life
Anomoses hylecoetes
Wikispecies
Mikko's Phylogeny Archive

Hepialoidea
Monotypic moth genera
Taxa named by Alfred Jefferis Turner
Exoporia genera
Moths of Australia